Mariano Frogioni is an Argentine clarinetist.

Frogioni is the national chairperson of the International Clarinet Association for Argentina. He taught at the National Music Conservatory of Buenos Aires. He was also the principal clarinetist of the Orquestra Sinfónica Nacional until his retirement. Frogioni belongs to the Mozarteum Wind Quintet.

References

External links
 http://www.fundacionkonex.org/b779-mariano-frogioni

Living people
Clarinetists
Argentine musicians
Year of birth missing (living people)
Place of birth missing (living people)
21st-century clarinetists